Kaido Saks (born 24 July 1986) is an Estonian professional basketball player who plays as a small forward. He currently plays for Korvpalli Meistriliiga team TLÜ/Kalev.

International career
Saks is a member of the Estonia national basketball team since 2010.

References

External links
Profile at Eurobasket
Profile at Baltic Basketball League

1986 births
Living people
Bakken Bears players
BC Kalev/Cramo players
BC Rakvere Tarvas players
BC Tallinn Kalev players
Estonian men's basketball players
Korvpalli Meistriliiga players
TTÜ KK players
Small forwards